Obermajer is a surname, a Czech form of the German surname Obermaier. Notable people with the surname include:

 Miroslav Obermajer (born 1973), Czech footballer
 Tomáš Obermajer (born 1960), Czech footballer

Czech-language surnames
Germanic-language surnames